Hell's Half Acre is a 1954 American film noir black and white crime film directed by John H. Auer starring Wendell Corey, Evelyn Keyes and Elsa Lanchester. It was produced and distributed by Republic Pictures.

Plot
A woman whose husband is declared missing in action after Pearl Harbor flies to Hawaii after the war to conduct her own investigation.

Her husband, ex-racketeer Chet Chester (Corey), is actually still alive but changed his identity due to his own criminal activities. However, he is being blackmailed by his former criminal partners, including Roger Kong.

Chester's girlfriend Sally (Nancy Gates) kills one of his enemies, but Chester takes the blame, assuming that he still has enough clout to escape with a light sentence.

The Chief of Police confirms to the wife that the husband was killed at Pearl Harbor and tears up his criminal record to protect his family from shame.

Cast
 Wendell Corey as Chet Chester, aka Randy Williams
 Evelyn Keyes as Donna Williams
 Elsa Lanchester as Lida O'Reilly
 Marie Windsor as Rose
 Nancy Gates as Sally Lee
 Leonard Strong as Ippy
 Jesse White as Tubby Otis
 Keye Luke as Police Chief Dan
 Philip Ahn as Roger Kong
 Clair Widenaar as Jamison
 Robert Costa as "Slim" Novak

Reception

Critical response
The New York Times gave the film a positive review and wrote, "Betwixt the start and the finish, an undemanding spectator will find enough sequences of merit to hold his interest. And the story of destined doom and back-alley murder is not entirely implausible. Miss Keyes, an innocent caught in the tangled web, is a luscious young thing who certainly earns her "A" in acting. She shines nicely in contrast to the denizens of Hell's Half Acre, ostensibly a very unsocial area of Honolulu. John Auer, the director, makes his camera capture the most in picture value of what appears to be some very dingy neighborhoods with a resultant atmosphere that creates a certain element of suspense. His method of direction, aided and abetted by Steve Fisher's economical script, is one of sensible brevity without unnecessary frills."

References

External links
 
 
 
 Hell's Half Acre informational page at DVD Beaver (includes images)
  Hell's Half Acre informational page and review by Glenn Erickson at DVD Savant 
 

1954 films
1954 crime drama films
1954 adventure films
1950s mystery films
American crime drama films
American black-and-white films
1950s English-language films
Film noir
Republic Pictures films
American mystery films
Films set in Hawaii
1950s American films